Jiuxian may refer to the following places in China:

Juntan Reservoir, also known as Jiuxian Lake, a reservoir in Shangrao, Jiangxi, China

Towns, townships, and subdistricts
in Fujian
Jiuxian Township, Songxi County, a township in Songxi County, Fujian
Jiuxian Township, Shanghang County, a township in Shanghang County, Fujian

in Shanxi
Jiuxian, Gu County (旧县), a town in Gu County, Shanxi
Jiuxian Township, Shanxi (旧县), a township in Hequ County, Shanxi

in other provinces
Jiuxian, Anhui (旧县), a town in Taihe County, Anhui
Jiuxian, Beijing, a town in Beijing
Jiuxian Subdistrict, Chongqing (旧县), a subdistrict in Chongqing
Jiuxian Township, Gansu (九岘), a township in Ning County, Gansu
Jiuxian, Henan (旧县), a town in Song County, Henan
Jiuxian, Hubei (旧县), a town in Yuan'an County, Hubei
Jiuxian, Shaanxi (旧县), a town in Luochuan County, Shaanxi
Jiuxian Township, Shandong, a township in Dongping County, Shandong
Jiuxian Township, Sichuan (旧县), a township in Wusheng County, Sichuan
Jiuxian Subdistrict, Qujing (旧县), a subdistrict in Qujing, Yunnan
Jiuxian Subdistrict, Tonglu County (旧县), a subdistrict in Tonglu County, Zhejiang